Ed Atkins (born 1982) is a British contemporary artist best known for his video art and poetry. He is currently based in Berlin. Atkins lectures at Goldsmiths College in London and has been referred to as "one of the great artists of our time" by the Swiss curator Hans-Ulrich Obrist.

Early life and education
Atkins was raised in Stonesfield, a small village outside Oxford. His mother was an art teacher at a public school and his father was a graphic artist. He earned his bachelor's degree from  Central Saint Martins and later graduated from The Slade School of University College London with a master's degree in Fine Art.

Work 

Through a practice that involves layering apostrophic text with high definition video, Ed Atkins makes work in which "The suck and the bloom of death and decay are channeled through technological tools at the height of contemporary image management". Atkins' video oeuvre is composed largely of stock footage and CGI avatars that are animated using motion capture and dramatic, commercial sound. Many of these videos feature a computer generated avatar as an isolated protagonist, whose poetic soliloquies intimately address the viewer. This protagonist, often surrounded by generic stock images and cinematic special effects, has been noted as capable of procuring the uncanny valley effect. In Us Dead Talk Love (2012), a 37-minute two-channel video work, the avatar speaks on finding an eyelash under their foreskin, a confession that sparks "a meditation on authenticity, self-representation, and the possibility for love".

Atkins consciously produces the majority of his work on a computer. From this laptop-based process and the works' foregrounding of video technology, he is known for his probing of the material structure of digital video. Often citing structural film artists such as Hollis Frampton as an influence, it is apparent that Atkins is interested in the technological possibilities of new media. A prolific writer, Atkins' video works are often derived from writing.

Atkins has had solo exhibitions at the Tate Britain, the Stedelijk Museum Amsterdam, the Chisenhale Gallery, MoMA PS1, the Serpentine Gallery, Palais de Tokyo, and Kunsthalle Zürich. At the Serpentine Memory Marathon in 2012 he premiered DEPRESSION, a performance work that uses projection, digitally altered voice, and chroma key mask to simulate the cinematic techniques of his videos. In conjunction with the Serpentine Extinction Marathon of 2014, Atkins produced www.80072745, a domain that invites users to sign up for a one-sided decade long email correspondence.

Further reading
Kathy Noble, 'Ed Atkins', ArtReview, London, no. 46, March 2011, p. 97.
Roger Atwood, 'Guys on the Edge: Ed Atkins's Not-Quite-Human, Computer-Generated Men', "ARTnews", New York, vol. 114, no. 9, October 2015, p. 54-61 
Isobel Harbison, 'Ed Atkins', Frieze, London, no.139, May 2011. Last accessed on 30 April 2015.
Richard Whitby, 'Ed Atkins', MAP Magazine, Glasgow, no. 25, 10 July 2011. Last accessed on 30 April 2015.
Patrick Ward, 'Cross Platform', The Wire, London, October, 2011, p.v16.
Dan Kidner, 'More Than a Feeling', Frieze, London, no. 142, October 2011, p. 210-215.
Ed Atkins and Caterina Riva, 'Come Dine With Us', Nero, Rome, no. 25, Winter 2011, p. 35-39.
Hans Ulrich Obrist and Ed Atkins, 'Ed Atkins; Interview by Hans Ulrich Obrist', Kaleidoscope, Milan, no.13, Winter 2011/2012, p. 138-147. Last accessed on 30 April 2015.
Martin Herbert, 'Ed Atkins', Artforum, New York, vol. 56, no. 6, February 2012, p. 212-215.
'Atkins: In Conversation With', Aesthetica, New York, 1 August 2012. Last accessed on 30 April 2015.
Isobel Harbison, 'Ed Atkins at the Chisenhale Gallery, London', Kaleidoscope, Milan, no. 16, Fall 2012, p. 130.
Katy Guggenheim, 'Ed Atkins, Us Dead Talk Love at Chisenhale Gallery, London', Mouse, Milan, 24 October 2012. Last accessed on 30 April 2015.
Oliver Basciano, 'Ed Atkins and James Richards, in conversation', ArtReview, London, no. 64, December 2012, p. 95-101.
Jennifer Krasinski, 'The Sites of Death', Spike, Vienna, no. 35, Spring 2013, p. 56-65.
Kirsty Bell, 'Ed Atkins' Warm, Warm Warm *Spring Mouths', Art Agenda, New York, 1 April 2013. Last accessed on 30 April 2015.
Kevin McGarry '12th Lyon Biennale', Frieze, London, no. 159, November–December 2013, p. 150-151.
Klaus Biesenbach, 'An intimately, duplicitously reflexive experience', Flash Art, Milan, vol. 46, no. 293, November–December 2013, p. 18-53.

References

Living people
1982 births
English contemporary artists
British experimental filmmakers
English experimental filmmakers
Alumni of Central Saint Martins